Orbais-l'Abbaye is a commune in the Marne department in north-eastern France. The abbey at Orbais was founded at the end of the 7th century by Saint Réol, and the remains (including a church) are situated in the centre of the town.

History
Founded at the end of the 7th century by Saint Réol, 26th Bishop of Reims, the benedictine Abbey is located in the Surmelin valley. Of the first monks who settled in Orbais, six came from the monastery of Rebais and followed the rule of saint Benedict.

The St. Pierre-St. Paul Church was built at the end of the 12th century and early 13th century.

René de Rieux was commendatory abbot of Orbais between 1626 and 1651 and was also abbot of the Abbeys of Notre-Dame de Daoulas and Relec, as well as Bishop of León.

During World War I, the French 5th Army established its campaign headquarters in the castle on September 3, 1914.

Population
At the revolution the population was about 850, between about 1835 and 1870 the population was about 1000 people and then began to decline. The population is 561 as of 2017.

Landmarks

 Abbaye Saint-Pierre
 Tour Saint-Réole
 La source Minette

Abbey

The St. Pierre-St. Paul church was built at the end of the 12th century and early 13th century by Jean of Orbais, one of the architects of the Cathedral of Reims. The abbey church had a length of 78 m with eight bays of nave, two of which remain today. The architecture is superb, particularly the façade, with its two towers similar to those of the Basilica Saint-Rémi de Reims and the choir with ambulatory with five radiating chapels. There is also stained glass windows of the 12 century, funerary slabs from the 14th and 15th centuries, a baptismal font from the 16th century, the glazed tiles from the 15th century and impressive stalls of choir and very decorated misericords.

Wine production

Orbais-l'Abbaye is part of the Champagne wine region. Pommery have vineyards there. In 2008 it was proposed to redraw the region boundaries, excluding Orbais-l'Abbaye. As of 2019, the change had not happened, with a final decision expected in 2024.

Notable people

Gottschalk of Orbais, monk in Orbais
Jean of Orbais

References

See also

Communes of the Marne department

Orbaislabbaye